General elections to the Cortes Generales were held in Spain on May 10, 1873. At stake were all 383 seats in the Congress of Deputies. The Federal Democratic Republican Party won the elections.

History
The elections were held with universal male suffrage. The 1873 were both the first and last of the brief 1st Spanish Republic. The elections, however, were held in very unorthodox conditions and drew a very low turnout, as neither the Carlist or alfonsist monarchists participated in the elections. The same happened with centralist and unitarian Republicans, or even the incipient labor organizations affiliated with the 1st International, that held a boycott campaign. Those were possibly the election with the lowest turnout in the history of Spain. In Catalonia only the 25% of the electorate voted. In Madrid the 28%. This left the republic with a serious lack of legitimacy.

Results

References

 CONGRESO DE LOS DIPUTADOS - HISTORICO DE DIPUTADOS 1810-1977
 Representative elections in the Republic - 10 de mayo de 1873

1873 elections in Spain
1873 in Spain
1873
May 1873 events
First Spanish Republic